A list of films produced by the Bollywood film industry based in Mumbai in 1997:

Top-grossing productions

1997

References

https://gaana.com/artist/raju-chauhan

https://twitter.com/rajeshsing13

https://www.imdb.com/name/nm0796505/

https://www.cinestaan.com/people/anil-matto-71309

https://www.imdb.com/name/nm0712542/

 Bollywood
1997
Lists of 1997 films by country or language
1997 in Indian cinema